Miyoko Schinner (née Nishimoto) is an American vegan activist, entrepreneur, chef, cookbook author, and founder of the dairy-free goods company, Miyoko's Creamery.

Early life and education 
Schinner was born in a town outside of Tokyo, Japan as Miyoko Nishimoto. She came to the United States when she was seven, grew up in Mill Valley, California, and at age 12 decided to become a vegetarian (which led her to cooking her own meals). She began college at the Pratt Institute in order to study graphic design, but dropped out after a year. She eventually transferred to St. John's College (Annapolis), and graduated with a B.A. in Philosophy in 1979.

Early Career 
Schinner transitioned to eating vegan in the mid-1980s. In 1994, she opened the vegan restaurant Now and Zen in San Francisco. It eventually expanded into a natural food company of the same name, and was sold in 2003. 

Schinner has launched a number of vegan brands, such as UnTurkey, which she exhibited at the 1995 Natural Products Expo alongside competitor Tofurky, and Hip Whip.

Miyoko's Creamery

In 2014, Schinner launched vegan cheese company Miyoko's Kitchen, later renaming it Miyoko's Creamery. Tofurky founder Seth Tibbott was the company's first investor. In 2016, the Specialty Food Association reported the company had "grown 300% year over year," and "they recently signed on to a new 28,000+ square-foot headquarters in Petaluma."

Legal
Schinner is a leading advocate for the right of vegan food products to use traditional meat and dairy terms on their labels. In particular, she has  been involved in legal challenges over product laws that regulate vegan food labeling, with Schinner arguing the laws violate free speech. 

In August of 2021, Miyoko's Creamery prevailed in their lawsuit against the California Department of Food and Agriculture's attempts to force the company to cease using the words "Cheese" and "Butter" among others in the marketing of their products.

In February 2023, Miyoko's Creamery announced that it and Schinner had parted ways. In addition, on February 16, Miyoko's Creamery also filed a law suit against Schinner, alleging that she misappropriated confidential information and copied the data to her personal cloud after the board of directors voted to terminate her as CEO. The case was filed in the US District Court for the Norther District of California, Case 3:23-cv-00711.

On March 3, 2023, Schinner’s attorney Lisa Bloom announced that Schinner would be filing a wrongful termination counter lawsuit. Bloom stated: “The company's behavior in forcing her out of the company she created and built, then trashing her via an outrageously malicious and misleading lawsuit will be met with facts and witnesses showing that Miyoko's own complaints of toxic and sexist behavior by certain male executives were swept under the rug, and then she was demoted and fired.”

Rancho Compassion
In 2015, Schinner founded the nonprofit Rancho Compasion farmed animal sanctuary in Nicasio, California.

Cookbooks and television show
In 1991 The Book Publishing Company published her first vegan cookbook The Now and Zen Epicure. In 2012, it published Artisan Vegan Cheese. That same year she began co-hosting PBS cooking show Vegan Mashup, with Toni Fiore and Terry Hope Romero.

Ten Speed Press published Schinner's The Homemade Vegan Pantry in 2015, and The Vegan Meat Cookbook: Meatless Favorites. Made with Plants. in 2021.

Personal life 
Schinner is married to  Michael Schinner, with whom she opened "Rancho Compassion." They have three children, a son (a basketball player in Japan) and two daughters. In 2023, Schinner defined herself as an "Epicurean activist out to end cruelty to animals and climate change by connecting our palate to our future."

Honors
In 2018, Melaina Juntti of New Hope Network described Schinner as a "vegan rock star". Schinner was among 28 women featured in PopSugar's "28 Women Changing the World Right This Second" list, a project backed by UN Women.

In 2019, The Homemade Vegan Pantry was named one of the Best Vegan Cookbooks by Good Housekeeping magazine.

In 2021, Schinner was included in the inaugural Forbes 50 Over 50 list.

Awards

Works

References

External links
 
 
Former Miyoko’s Creamery CEO countersues Petaluma company’s board, alleges gender discrimination and retaliation - The Press Democrat, March 17, 2023.

Year of birth missing (living people)
Living people
Japanese emigrants to the United States
St. John's College (Annapolis/Santa Fe) alumni
American people of Japanese descent
American businesspeople
American veganism activists
Vegan cookbook writers
American writers
American chefs
Asian American chefs
Chefs of vegan cuisine
American cookbook writers